Dewey is a city in Washington County, Oklahoma, United States. Founded by Jacob A. Bartles in 1899, the town was named for Admiral George Dewey. It was incorporated December 8, 1905. The population was 3,179 at the 2000 census and 3,432 at the 2010 census, an increase of 8 percent.

History
In 1899, Jacob Bartles moved his grist mill and trading post three miles north from Bartlesville to property he owned along the Atchison, Topeka and Santa Fe Railroad. He built the Dewey Hotel in the following year. The first newspaper in town, the Dewey Eagle, began publication in 1900, and the Missouri, Kansas and Texas Railroad came to Dewey in 1903.

Geography
Dewey is located at  (36.796106, -95.936102).

Demographics

As of the census of 2000, there were 3,179 people, 1,298 households, and 869 families residing in the city. The population density was 1,252.2 people per square mile (483.2/km2). There were 1,457 housing units at an average density of 573.9 per square mile (221.5/km2). The racial makeup of the city was 78.64% White, 2.17% African American, 11.01% Native American, 0.06% Asian, 1.67% from other races, and 6.45% from two or more races. Hispanic or Latino of any race were 3.30% of the population.

There were 1,298 households, out of which 30.6% had children under the age of 18 living with them, 49.4% were married couples living together, 13.3% had a female householder with no husband present, and 33.0% were non-families. 30.0% of all households were made up of individuals, and 15.5% had someone living alone who was 65 years of age or older. The average household size was 2.37 and the average family size was 2.91.

In the city, the population was spread out, with 25.5% under the age of 18, 7.4% from 18 to 24, 25.6% from 25 to 44, 21.7% from 45 to 64, and 19.8% who were 65 years of age or older. The median age was 39 years. For every 100 females, there were 87.2 males. For every 100 females age 18 and over, there were 82.5 males.

The median income for a household in the city was $27,225, and the median income for a family was $35,844. Males had a median income of $28,309 versus $20,052 for females. The per capita income for the city was $15,429. About 13.4% of families and 16.5% of the population were below the poverty line, including 24.1% of those under age 18 and 11.9% of those age 65 or over.

The Tom Mix Museum, dedicated to the movie actor Tom Mix, is also located in Dewey, Oklahoma.

Notable people
 Jack Hartman, College basketball coach
 Fred Jordan, former State of Oklahoma representative from 2006-2014
 Olive Stokes Mix, actress
 Ruth Mix, actress

References

External links
 City of Dewey Official Website
 Encyclopedia of Oklahoma History and Culture - Dewey

Cities in Oklahoma
Cities in Washington County, Oklahoma
Tulsa metropolitan area